Roosevelt Island is the second largest ice rise of Antarctica and world-wide, after Berkner Island. Despite its name, it is not an island, since the bedrock below the ice at its highest part is below sea level.

Examination of how the ice flows above it establishes the existence and extent of the ice rise. 
 Radar surveying carried out between 1995 and 2013 showed that the Raymond Effect was operating beneath the ice divide.
The ice rise has become a focus of the Roosevelt Island Climate Evolution (RICE) research
 using ice coring.

Rear Admiral Richard E. Byrd named it in 1934 after US President Franklin D. Roosevelt. Byrd was the leader of the expedition that discovered the ice rise. Roosevelt Island lies within the boundaries of the Ross Dependency, New Zealand's Antarctic claim.

See also
 Composite Antarctic Gazetteer
 SCAR
 Territorial claims in Antarctica

References

Ice rises of Antarctica
Geography of the Ross Dependency
Bodies of ice of the Ross Dependency